Kemalpaşa (original name: Noghedi, former Makriyali; Laz and Georgian: მაკრიალი/Makriali or ნოღედი/Noghedi) is a town on the Black Sea coast in Artvin Province, Turkey. It is the seat of Kemalpaşa District. Its population is 5,715 (2021).

Until 1547 it was a part of the Principality of Guria of the Kingdom of Imereti. In June 1367 here in Makriali Church the royal wedding took place between the king Bagrat V of Georgia and Anna of Trebizond. In 1547 it was annexed to Ottoman Empire. From 1915 to 1917 — occupied by the Russian Empire during the First World War. From 1918 to 1921 Kemalpaşa became a part of the Democratic Republic of Georgia. After the occupation of the Georgian Democratic Republic by the Soviet Red Army, the village was ceded to Turkey in 1922. In 1987 it was declared township. It became the seat of a district in 2017.

See also
Selimiye Tunnel

References

External links 

 the Municipality

Populated places in Artvin Province
Towns in Turkey
Kemalpaşa District, Artvin
Populated coastal places in Turkey
Things named after Mustafa Kemal Atatürk